The following highways are numbered 570:

Canada
 Alberta Highway 570

United States